Aidan Corr (born 17 May 1994) is a professional Australian rules footballer playing for the North Melbourne Football Club in the Australian Football League (AFL), having previously played for the Greater Western Sydney Giants . The Giants drafted the defender with pick 14 in the 2012 national draft. He debuted in round 6, 2013, against  at Etihad Stadium.

Born in Brockagh in County Tyrone, Northern Ireland, Corr emigrated to Australia with his family at the age of three.

References

External links

1994 births
Living people
VFL/AFL players born outside Australia
Greater Western Sydney Giants players
Australian rules footballers from Victoria (Australia)
Northern Knights players
Northern Ireland emigrants to Australia
Sportspeople from County Tyrone
North Melbourne Football Club players